Frontier Days is the debut album released in 1984 by The Del-Lords on EMI America Records.

Track listing 
All songs written by Scott Kempner, except "How Can a Poor Man Stand Such Times and Live?" by Alfred Reed

Personnel 

The Del-Lords
Scott Kempner – lead vocals, guitar
Eric Ambel – guitar, vocals
Manny Caiati – bass guitar, vocals
Frank Funaro – drums, vocals

Additional musicians and production
Warren Bruleigh – engineering
The Del-Lords – production
James Hamilton – photography
Michael Hodgson – design
Scott James – engineering
Bob Ludwig – mastering
Terry Manning – mixing
Henry Marquez – art direction
Bob Richey – illustrations
Jon Smith – engineering
Lou Whitney – production

References 

1984 debut albums
The Del-Lords albums
EMI America Records albums